During the 2006–07 Dutch football season, PSV competed in the Eredivisie.

Season summary
PSV clinched a third successive Eredivisie title. The club had been 11 points ahead of second-placed AZ after 20 matches, but their lead disappeared in the next 13 until, following PSV's draw at FC Utrecht in the penultimate round, PSV, AZ and Ajax all stood equal on 72 points from 33 matches, with AZ leading the Eredivisie on goal difference. AZ suffered a shock defeat at Excelsior in the final round, playing with 10 men after 15 minutes in the game. Ajax won 0–2 at Willem II, and PSV beat Vitesse 5–1. PSV and Ajax both finished on 75 points, but PSV finished first due to a superior goal difference (+50, against +49 for Ajax) to end one of the most exciting and closest title races in many years.

PSV enjoyed decent form in the UEFA Champions League as well. Entering directly into the group stage, the club finished second in Group C, behind Liverpool and ahead of Bordeaux and Galatasaray. PSV went on to face the previous season's runners-up Arsenal in the first knockout round. Édison Méndez, who had been nominated for the 2006 Ballon d'Or, scored PSV's goal in a 1–0 win at the Philips Stadion, and an Alex goal in the Emirates Stadium gave PSV a 2–1 aggregate win. Liverpool then made a return to the Netherlands to face the club in the quarter-finals, and recorded a solid 3–0 win. A 1–0 win in the return leg at Anfield saw PSV eliminated.

Squad
Squad at end of season

Left club during season

Statistics

Starting 11
Considering starts in all competitions

Results

Johan Cruyff Shield

Eredivisie

Matches

References

PSV Eindhoven seasons
Psv Eindhoven
Dutch football championship-winning seasons